Edwin de Graaf (born 30 April 1980) is a Dutch football manager and former player. He is the manager of Eerste Divisie club Roda JC.

Career

Club career
De Graaf is a midfielder who was born in The Hague and made his debut in professional football, being part of the RBC Roosendaal squad in the 2001–02 season. He also played for Feyenoord Rotterdam and ADO Den Haag before joining NAC Breda.

On 15 June 2010, he signed a two-year deal with Scottish Premier League club Hibernian. De Graaf made an "impressive" performance in his home debut for Hibs, scoring two goals in a 3–2 defeat by NK Maribor. His later performances were not as productive, however, as he missed clear goalscoring chances in games against The Rangers, Inverness and Kilmarnock.

De Graaf struggled to hold down a place under Hughes' successor, Colin Calderwood, and was loaned to SBV Excelsior for the remainder of the 2010–11 season. Calderwood stated in April 2011 that he had received good reports about De Graaf's performances for Excelsior and confirmed that he would return to Easter Road for the 2011–12 season. His contract with Hibernian was terminated and he signed for SBV Excelsior on 1 September 2011.

International career 
De Graaf has represented the Netherlands B national football team five times.

Coaching career

Feyenoord
Retiring in the summer 2013, De Graaf was hired as head coach of Feyenoord's U14s.

Drunk driving 
In March 2015, De Graaf was arrested after he was driving under the influence of alcohol, causing an accident on the highway half past three in the night. De Graaf drove into his predecessor on the highway near Zoetermeer with his Opel. The victim's car would be a total loss. De Graaf decided not to stop, but shortly afterwards he was put aside by the police. An investigation by Feyenoord later showed that De Graaf had 'slightly exceeded the maximum permitted alcohol level at the time of the incident. For that reason, he only received a 'strong warning' from the club and was not fired. He continued in his position as head coach of the club's U16s. However, shortly before the start of the 2017–18 season, De Graaf decided to leave the club to seek for a new challenge.

ADO Den Haag
A few hours after leaving Feyenoord, it was confirmed that de Graaf had been appointed assistant manager to Alfons Groenendijk at ADO Den Haag. In December 2019, an heated conflict took place between ADO-player, Donny Gorter, and de Graaf. A brawl allegedly started, after which technical manager Jeffrey van As decided to send De Graaf home. On 9 January 2020 the club confirmed, that de Graaf's contract had been terminated.

Roda
On 24 January 2023, de Graaf was hired by Roda JC in Eerste Divisie until the end of the 2022–23 season.

External links

References

1980 births
Living people
Dutch footballers
Dutch expatriate footballers
Dutch expatriate sportspeople in Scotland
Expatriate footballers in Scotland
Eredivisie players
Eerste Divisie players
Derde Divisie players
Scottish Premier League players
RBC Roosendaal players
Feyenoord players
ADO Den Haag players
NAC Breda players
Hibernian F.C. players
Footballers from The Hague
Excelsior Rotterdam players
FC Lisse players
Association football midfielders
Dutch football managers
NAC Breda managers
Eerste Divisie managers
Roda JC Kerkrade managers